Compañeros is a Spanish teen drama television series. Produced by Globomedia, it aired on Antena 3 from 1998 to 2002.

Premise 
The fiction follows the mishaps of a group of teenagers studying for the Bachillerato at the Instituto Azcona.

Cast 
 Eva Santolaria as Valle Bermejo.
 Antonio Hortelano as Quimi Verdet.
  as Sara Antón.
 Nicolás Belmonte as Eloy Rubio.
  as César Vallalta.
  as Isabel Arbueso.
 Ruth Núñez as Tanja Mijatovic.
  as Arancha Alberti.
  as Lolo Bermejo Fuentes.
  as Luismi Bárcenas.
 Clara Lago as Desirée.
 Miguel Rellán as Félix Torán.
  as Alfredo Torán.
  as Rocío.
 Beatriz Carvajal as Marisa Viñé.
 Cristina Peña as Jose.
 César Vea as Gustavo.
 David Janer as Martín.
 Begoña Maestre as Duna Belarde.
 Tina Sainz as Tere Roncesvalles.
 Mercè Pons as Ana.

Production and release 
The series premiered on 25 March 1998. Produced by Globomedia and created by Manuel Valdivia, the series was initially produced with a tight budget. It eventually became one of the most iconic Spanish fiction series. The broadcasting run, comprising 121 episodes and 9 seasons, ended on 16 July 2002.

In 2018, Colegas, a spoof web series (paying homage to Compañeros and another popular teen drama series from the 1990s, Al salir de clase), featuring some actors from the series, was broadcast on Playz.

References 

1998 Spanish television series debuts
2002 Spanish television series endings
1990s Spanish drama television series
2000s Spanish drama television series
Spanish teen drama television series
Antena 3 (Spanish TV channel) network series
Spanish-language television shows
1990s teen drama television series
2000s teen drama television series
Television series about teenagers
Television series by Globomedia